Ousmane Kone (born 19 May 1952) is a Malian politician who has been Minister of Health and Public Hygiene in the Council of Ministers of Mali from 2013 to 2015. He obtained a bachelor's degree at Lycée Askia Mohamed in 1972. He also studied at the École nationale d’administration (ÉNA) in Bamako, the University of Montpellier and the Mediterranean Agronomic Institute of Montpellier. From 2002 to 2013, he was the technical advisor to the Ministry of Health.

References

1952 births
Living people
Health ministers of Mali
Government ministers of Mali
People from Bamako
21st-century Malian people